Senko may refer to:
 Senko, Mali
 Pavel Senko (1916–2000), a Russian explorer and scientist
 Senkō (線香), Japanese incense
 Senkō hanabi (線香花火), Japanese incense firework, sparkler
 "Senkō" (閃光 "flash of light"), a song by Japanese pop singer Tomiko Van
 The Helpful Fox Senko-san, a Japanese manga and anime series